A Toba medicine container is an object that was used to hold herbs and medicines by the Toba people. They were generally carved from bone, as well as cherry wood. Then fashioned into a variety of shapes such as animals & deities. Their stoppers resembled Bali Timur statues, with a serpent head atop a Batak warrior. 
The outside of the container showed a calendar, marked to represent the days of use and non-use for the tube's contents.

Batak
Pharmacognosy